The Moyzes Quartet is a Slovakian string quartet.  It was founded in 1975, and consists of Stanislav Mucha (first violin), František Török (second violin), Alexander Lakatoš (viola) and Ján Slávik (cello).

The members of the quartet studied first at the Bratislava Academy of Music and Performing Arts, then at the Hochschule fur Musik und darstellende Kunst in Vienna.   The quartet has made over 30 recordings, including works by Shostakovich, Dvořák, Smetana, and Slovak composers such as Ján Levoslav Bella, Alexander Moyzes and Eugen Suchoň.

Slovak musical groups
String quartets